Susuzosmaniye is a quarter of the town İhsaniye, İhsaniye District, Afyonkarahisar Province, Turkey. Its population is 54 (2021).

References

İhsaniye District